Shaun Rouse (born 28 February 1972) is an English former professional footballer who played in the Football League as a midfielder.

References

1972 births
Living people
Sportspeople from Great Yarmouth
English footballers
Association football midfielders
Rangers F.C. players
Bristol City F.C. players
Carlisle United F.C. players
Weston-super-Mare A.F.C. players
Gloucester City A.F.C. players
Witney Town F.C. players
English Football League players